Leto Regio is a geological feature on Phoebe, a small outer moon of Saturn. It is classified as a Regio, a large area marked by reflectivity or color distinctions from adjacent areas, or a broad geographic region.

References

Surface features of Saturn's moons